Jonsbu was a Norwegian hunting and radio station (Jonsbu Radio/LMW) located on the coast of Eastern Greenland in present-day King Christian X Land. 

Administratively the area where the hut stood belongs now to the Northeast Greenland National Park.

History

It was named "Jónsbú" after Norwegian journalist John Schjelderup Giæver (1901–1970), who lived as a hunter and trapper in East Greenland from 1929 to 1934. The station had also been known as "Norsk Petersbugt Station". 

Together with Myggbukta, as well as Storfjord, Torgilsbu and Finnsbu further south, Jonsbu became part of the Norwegian contribution to the International Polar Year 1932–33. 

The original station was burnt down in August 1943 during World War II in an attack by Greenland Patrol ship . The ship destroyed the station in order to prevent its facilities from being used by the military of the Third Reich.

In order to differentiate the two huts, the ruin of the old station is also known as "Gamle Jonsbu" (Old Jonsbu) —although the name "Jónsbú Station" is still officially applied to it— and the new one as "Ny Jonsbu".

Bibliography
Spencer Apollonio, Lands That Hold One Spellbound: A Story of East Greenland, 2008
Frode Skarstein, “A cursed affair”—how a Norwegian expedition to Greenland became the USA’s first maritime capture in World War II. Norwegian Polar Institute,

See also
Antarctic Haven
Cape Biot
Myggbukta

References

External links 
 The Norwegian trapping cabin of Jonsbu, located in Petersbay in eastern Greenland, in 1939
 The World at War - Greenland 1721 - 1953
Ruins in Greenland
1932 establishments in Norway
History of Greenland